A flying wing is a type of tailless aircraft which has no distinct fuselage. The crew, engines and equipment are housed inside a thick wing, typically showing small nacelles, blisters and other housings.

List

|-
|Armstrong Whitworth A.W.52 || UK || Jet || Experimental || 1947 || Prototype || 2 || Twin engined.
|-
|BAE Systems Taranis || UK || Jet || UAV || 2013 || Prototype || n/a || 
|-
|Boeing Phantom Ray || US || Jet || UAV || 2011 || Prototype || n/a || 
|-
|Chyeranovskii BICh-3 || USSR || Propeller || Experimental || 1926 || Prototype || 1 || 
|-
|Dassault nEUROn || France || Jet || UAV || 2012 || Prototype || n/a || stealth
|-
|Delft Flying-V || Netherlands || Ducted fan || UAV || 2020 || Experimental || 1 || Scale model of proposed airliner
|-
|DRDO Ghatak || India || Jet || UCAV || 2022 || Prototype|| 1 || Scaled down technology demonstrator
|-
|Farrar V-1 Flying Wing || US || Glider ||  Homebuilt || 1962 || Prototype || 1 || 
|-
|Freel Flying Wing || US || Glider || Homebuilt || 1937 || Prototype || 1 || School project
|-
|Horten H.I || Germany || Glider || Experimental  || 1933 || Prototype || 2 || 
|-
|Horten H.II || Germany || Glider || Experimental  || 1935 || Prototype || 4 || 
|-
|Horten H.III || Germany || Glider || Experimental || 1937 || Prototype || 19 || 1 modified as motorglider
|-
|Horten H.IV || Germany || Glider ||  || 1941 || Prototype || 4 || IV and IVa had a fuselage.
|-
|Horten H.Va, b, c || Germany || Propeller || Experimental || 1937 || Prototype || 2 || Twin engined
|-
|Horten H.VII || Germany || Propeller || Trainer || 1942 || Prototype || 2 || Twin engined
|-
|Horten Ho 229 (H.IX) || Germany || Jet || Fighter || 1944 || Prototype || n/a || Two flown
|-
|Horten H.X || Germany || Jet || Fighter ||  || Project || 0 || 
|-
|Horten H.XI || Germany || Glider ||  ||  ||  || n/a || 
|-
|Horten H.XII || Germany || Propeller || Experimental || 1944 || Project || 0 || Powered H IVb with laminar flow wing
|-
|Horten H.XIV || Germany || Glider || Experimental || 1945 ||  || n/a || 
|-
|Horten H.XVIII || Germany || Jet || Bomber || 1945 || Project || 0 || 
|-
|Horten Parabola || Germany || Glider || Experimental || 1938 || Project || 0 || Built but not flown.
|-
|Lockheed Martin RQ-170 Sentinel || US || UAV || Reconnaissance || 1991 || Production || 20 ca. || 
|-
|McDonnell Douglas A-12 Avenger II || US || Jet || Attack || 2007 || Project || 0 || 
|-
|Northrop B-2 Spirit || US || Jet || Bomber || 1989 || Production || 21 || 
|-
|Northrop Grumman B-21 Raider || US || Jet || Bomber || Current || Project || 0 || 
|-
|Northrop N-1M || US || Propeller || Experimental || 1940 || Prototype || 1 || 
|-
|Northrop N-9M || US || Propeller || Experimental || 1942 || Prototype || 4 || 
|-
|Northrop XP-79 || US || Jet || Fighter || 1945 || Prototype || 1 || 
|-
|Northrop XB-35 & YB-35 || US || Propeller || Bomber || 1945 || Prototype || n/a || 
|-
|Northrop YB-49 || US || Jet || Bomber || 1947 || Prototype || 3 || Converted YB-35.
|-
|Northrop Grumman Switchblade || US || Jet || UAV || 2008 || Project || 0 || 
|-
|NRC tailless glider || Canada || Glider || Research || 1946 || Prototype || 1 || 
|-
|Putilov Stal-5 || USSR || Propeller || Transport || 1933 || Project || 0 || 18 passengers, scale model flown 1935.
|-
|Saegheh || Iran || Jet || UAV || 2018 || Production || n/a ||
|-
|Sukhoi S-70 Okhotnik || Russia || Jet || UAV || 2019|| Prototype|| 1 || stealth
|-
|Vought V-173 || US || Propeller || Experimental || 1942 || Prototype || 1 || Circular wing.
|-
|Vought XF5U || US || Propeller || Fighter || 1947 || Project || 0 || Failed to fly
|}

See also
 Blended wing body
 Lifting body

References

External links
 Development History of Horten Flying Wing Aircraft

Lists of aircraft by wing configuration